Arumugam or Arumukan is a Tamil male given name. Due to the Tamil tradition of using patronymic surnames it may also be a surname for males and females. Arumugam is one of the many names of the Hindu god Murugan, which refers to his six faces (Aru = six + Mugam = face).

Notable people

Given name
 Arumugam, Indian politician
 A. Arumugam, Indian politician
 A. S. A. Arumugam, Indian politician
 C. Arumugam, Indian politician
 J. N. Arumugam (born 1896), Ceylonese civil servant
 R. Arumugam (born 1953), Malaysian footballer
 R. S. Arumugam, Indian politician
 T. Arumugam, Indian politician
 T. P. Arumugam, Indian politician
 V. Arumugam, Indian politician
 V. Arumugam, Malaysian politician
 Veerapandi S. Arumugam (1937–2012), Indian politician
 Arumuka Navalar (1822–1879), Ceylonese revivalist

Surname
 Arumugam Arulpiragasam (died 1975), Ceylonese civil servant
 Arumugam Canagaratnam (born 1873), Ceylonese lawyer and politician
 Arumugam Kandaiah Premachandran (born 1957), Sri Lankan politician
 Arumugam Kandiah Sarveswaran, Sri Lankan politician
 Arumugam Mohanasundaram (1928–2012), Indian actor
 Arumugam Pillai Coomaraswamy (1783–1836), Ceylonese politician
 Arumugam Sinnaththurai Thurairajah Raviharan, Sri Lankan politician
 Arumugam Thiagarajah (1916–1981), Sri Lankan teacher and politician
 Arumugam Thondaman (born 1964), Sri Lankan politician
 Arumugam Vijiaratnam (born 1921), Singaporean athlete
 Arumugam Wisvalingam Mailvaganam (1906–1987), Sri Lankan physicist and academic
 David Arumugam, Malaysian singer
 Loganathan Arumugam (1953–2007), Malaysian singer
 Nicole Arumugam, British actress

See also
 
 

Tamil masculine given names